The Ministry of Health and Wellness is a ministry in the Bahamas Government. Ministry plans, supervises, licenses and coordinates the country's healthcare services.

Cabinet

Areas of responsibility

The Ministry of Health Duane Sands   seeks to provide the leadership necessary to ensure and guard the protection and promotion of the health of all residents. It provides all residents with access to comprehensive, preventive, quality healthcare services and care.

The Ministry of Health seeks to protect the health of Bahamian residents against both current and emerging health threats. This is achieved, in part, by: helping individuals acquire the skills to live responsible, healthy and independent lives; providing a range of accessible, affordable services that assist individuals, families and communities to reach their full health potential; and monitoring both current and emerging disease threats.

The Ministry operates from a social model of health, whereby improvements in health and well-being are achieved by directing efforts towards addressing the social and environmental determinants of health, among others. The delivery of healthcare in The Bahamas is integrated and co-ordinated around the needs of residents, rather than service types, professional boundaries or organisational structure.

Departments and agencies

Technical Directorate

The Technical Directorate of the Ministry is composed of the Chief Medical Officer, Director of Public Health, and Director of Nursing.

The Chief Medical Officer advises both the Minister and the Permanent Secretary on technical, health matters.

The Director of Public Health has oversight for the Department of Public Health and advises the Permanent Secretary on all Public Health Matters.

The Director of Nursing  directs and advises the Permanent Secretary on all Nursing Matters.

References 

Bahamas
Government ministers of the Bahamas